Vangelee Williams (born 26 May 1992) is a Jamaican international netball player. Williams is a member of the Jamaica national netball team, the Sunshine Girls, and primarily plays at WD, GD and GK. She debuted for the Sunshine Girls in 2012 against South Africa, and was part of the teams that won bronze at the 2014 and 2018 Commonwealth Games, and that placed fourth at the 2015 Netball World Cup. She was also signed in 2016 to play in the English Superleague for Team Bath.

References

Jamaican netball players
Netball players at the 2014 Commonwealth Games
Netball players at the 2018 Commonwealth Games
Commonwealth Games bronze medallists for Jamaica
Commonwealth Games medallists in netball
1994 births
Living people
2019 Netball World Cup players
Team Bath netball players
Jamaican expatriate netball people in England
Medallists at the 2014 Commonwealth Games
Medallists at the 2018 Commonwealth Games